The seventh season of the American competitive reality television series MasterChef Junior premiered on Fox on March 12, 2019 and concluded on June 4, 2019. The season is hosted by regular judges Gordon Ramsay and Christina Tosi, while Aarón Sanchez joins the judges this season.

The winner was Che Spiotta, a 12-year-old from Boiceville, New York, with Ivy Angst from Atlanta, Georgia and Malia Brauer from Newhall, Santa Clarita, California being the runners-up.

Top 24 
Source for first names, ages, and hometowns:

Note: It is Fox's policy to not publish the last names of minor contestants. Any last name not listed has not been properly cited/sourced at this time.

Elimination table

  (WINNER) This cook won the competition.
  (RUNNERS-UP) These cooks finished in second place.
  (WIN) The cook won an individual challenge (Mystery Box Challenge, Elimination Test, Pressure Test, or Skills Challenge).
  (WIN) The cook was on the winning team in the Team Challenge and directly advanced to the next round.
  (HIGH) The cook was one of the top entries in the individual challenge but didn't win.
  (IN) The cook was not selected as a top or bottom entry in an individual challenge.
  (IN) The cook was not selected as a top or bottom entry in a Team Challenge.
  (IMM) The cook did not have to compete in that round of the competition and was safe from elimination.
  (IMM) The cook was selected by the Mystery Box Challenge winner and didn't have to compete in the Elimination Test.
  (LOW) The cook was one of the bottom entries in an individual challenge or Pressure Test, and advanced.
  (LOW) The cook was one of the bottom entries in a Team Challenge, and they advanced.
  (PT) The cook was on the losing team in the Team Challenge, competed in the Pressure Test, and advanced.
  (NPT) The cook was on the losing team in the Team Challenge, but did not compete in the Pressure Test, and advanced.
  (ELIM) The cook was eliminated.

Episodes

References

2019 American television seasons
Season 7